Gloria Camila Mosquera Riascos is a Colombian taekwondo practitioner. She won the gold medal in the women's +67kg event at the 2022 South American Games in Asunción, Paraguay and the 2022 Bolivarian Games in Valledupar, Colombia. She also won the gold medal in her event at the 2022 Pan American Taekwondo Championships held in Punta Cara, Dominican Republic.

In 2019, she competed in the women's heavyweight event at the World Taekwondo Championships held in Manchester, United Kingdom. She won the silver medal in the women's +67kg event at the Pan American Games held in Lima, Peru.

She competed in the women's heavyweight event at the 2022 World Taekwondo Championships held in Guadalajara, Mexico.

References

External links
 

Living people
Year of birth missing (living people)
Place of birth missing (living people)
Colombian female taekwondo practitioners
Competitors at the 2018 Central American and Caribbean Games
Central American and Caribbean Games bronze medalists for Colombia
Central American and Caribbean Games medalists in taekwondo
Pan American Games medalists in taekwondo
Pan American Games silver medalists for Colombia
Medalists at the 2019 Pan American Games
Competitors at the 2022 South American Games
South American Games gold medalists for Colombia
South American Games medalists in taekwondo
21st-century Colombian women